Annals of Carnegie Museum is a peer-reviewed academic journal published by the Carnegie Museum of Natural History. It was established in 1901 by the Board of Trustees of the Carnegie Institute. The journal is distributed both in print and online.  The museum's Office of Scientific Publications also publishes the Bulletin of Carnegie Museum of Natural History and Special Publications of Carnegie Museum.

The journal is abstracted and indexed in the Science Citation Index, Scopus, Biosis, and GEOBASE.

According to the Journal Citation Reports, the journal has a 2014 impact factor of 0.724, ranking it 38th out of 49 journals in the category "Paleontology" and 115th out of 153 journals in the category "Zoology".

References

External links 
 

Publications established in 1901
Open access journals
Carnegie Museum of Natural History
English-language journals
Zoology journals
Paleontology journals
Geology journals
Academic journals published by museums